Molaria is a genus of Cambrian arthropod, the type species M. spinifera is known from the Middle Cambrian Burgess Shale. 144 specimens of Molaria are known from the Greater Phyllopod bed, where they comprise 0.27% of the community. A second species M. steini was described from the Sirius Passet in Greenland in 2017.

The body of Molaria consisted of a head shield (cephalon), a trunk consisting of eight sections (tergites), and a telson, which included a short ventral spine and a long posterior spine. Three pairs of legs were beneath the cephalon and another eight pairs were attached to the trunk.  Eyes were lacking, but a pair of short antennae was present on the cephalon. Specimens of Molaria ranged from 8 to 26 mm in length from cephalon to telson, with the posterior spine slightly longer than the body length. Molaria was superficially similar to Habelia, another Burgess Shale arthropod with a long tail spine, but which possessed 12 trunk tergites. It is currently considered a member of Artiopoda.

The genus name derives from "Molar", the name of a mountain peak east of the Valley of the Ten Peaks in Alberta, Canada.

References

External links 
 

Burgess Shale fossils
Artiopoda
Cambrian arthropods
Fossil taxa described in 1912

Cambrian genus extinctions